Vicentinho Alves (born October 1, 1957) is a Brazilian politician. He has represented Tocantins in the Federal Senate since 2011. Previously he was a deputy from Tocantins from 2007 to 2011. He is a member of the Liberal Party (PL).

References

Living people
1957 births
Members of the Federal Senate (Brazil)
People from Tocantins
Members of the Chamber of Deputies (Brazil) from Tocantins
Liberal Party (Brazil, 2006) politicians
Solidariedade politicians
Liberal Party (Brazil, 1985) politicians
Brazilian Social Democracy Party politicians
Liberal Front Party (Brazil) politicians
Democratic Labour Party (Brazil) politicians